Civil Aviation Authority of Bangladesh (CAAB) functions as the regulatory body for all aviation related activities in Bangladesh. It is the civil aviation authority operating under the Ministry of Civil Aviation & Tourism. All nine operational airports (three international and six domestic) are operated by the CAAB. A member of International Civil Aviation Organization, it has signed bilateral air transport agreement with 52 states. It is headquartered in Kurmitola, Dhaka.

History

Pakistan period
Aviation in India can be traced to the first commercial flight on 18 February 1911, and grew during the period between the First and Second World Wars.  Some 103 airports, aerodrome, airfields and airstrips were built and operated by the Allied Air Forces in the part of present Bangladesh during the Second World War. These airfields were extensively used for conducting air operations during the Burma Campaign against the Axis powers. After the War, most of these facilities of the Royal Indian Air Force were left unused. After independence from British colonial rule and the partition of the subcontinent, the aviation infrastructure and facilities in what was then East Pakistan were inherited by the Pakistan Air Force.
 
After the Bangladesh Liberation War of 1971, a Department of Civil Aviation (DCA) was established Airports Development Agency was a limited company that was working before the Independence of Bangladesh since 1965 and worked as a contractor for the Department of Civil Aviation.

The Department of Civil Aviation and the Airports Development Agency were merged by the government of Bangladesh to create Civil Aviation Authority in 1982.

In 1985, the present Civil Aviation Authority of Bangladesh (CAAB) came into existence as a body corporate with full managerial power, both organisational and financial, vested with it vide Ordinance, 1985. This ordinance repealed Ordinance, 82, dissolved the previously constituted Civil Aviation Authority and transferring all its establishment, assets and liabilities to the new authority.

Functions
As a regulatory body, CAAB implements the rules, regulations and directives of the Government of Bangladesh and the standards and recommendations of the International Civil Aviation Organization (ICAO). As per the provisions laid down in Civil Aviation Ordinance 1960 and Civil Aviation Rules 1984, this organisation acts as the aeronautical authority of Bangladesh and discharges the duties and responsibilities as laid down by ICAO.

Flight safety and regulations

 Registration of aircraft: CAAB maintains register for all Bangladeshi aircraft.
 Certification of Air-worthiness: To ensure flight safety, airworthiness of aircraft must be ensured first. An aircraft can be regarded as airworthy if it and its components conform with design standards, are of approved type and are in sound operational condition. CAAB regularly inspects the aircraft registered in Bangladesh and issues/renews certificate of airworthiness for the worthy aircraft, and suspends/cancels such certificate of unworthy ones. Without such certificate no aircraft should attempt to fly. CAAB also continuously monitors all maintenance activities with Bangladesh aircraft, approves certificate for aircraft type and certificate for maintenance establishments, issues directions regarding maintenance, approves design modification, repair and replacement of any component.
 Personnel Licensing: Each personnel responsible for flight operations on board – pilot, navigator, flight engineer, flight instructor, air traffic controller etc. – and aircraft maintenance engineer on ground should have appropriate license proving his ability and skill before he engages himself in respective job. CAAB tests and issues/renews licenses to the successful applicants. No member of the aircrew and no maintenance engineer should engage in flying operations and participate in maintenance works respectively without such license.
 Bi-lateral Agreements: CAAB examines documents submitted by other countries in regard to bilateral Air Services Agreements, negotiations and prepares brief for the Government. Any foreign airline intending to operate scheduled flights in the country must be designated pursuant to such Government level agreements.
 Air Transport Service Authorisation: CAAB issues/cancels license for Bangladeshi enterprises of air transport services, and approves, revises if required, tariff including fares, rates, charges, commissions, and terms and conditions associated with their business.

Air traffic services

 CAAB provides air traffic control service to each aircraft flying in the national airspace and moving on manoeuvring areas of Bangladesh aerodromes to prevent collisions, and to maintain expedite and orderly flow of air traffic.
 CAAB establishes air routes, and flying, approaching and landing procedures for each route and aerodrome belonging to the country.
 CAAB makes all necessary arrangements for search and rescue operations in case of accident or missing of any aircraft, and conducts investigations against accidents and unwanted incidents related to aircraft.

Communication and navigation

CAAB makes provisions for facilities and services for aeronautical telecommunications and air navigation to ensure safety, regularity and efficiency of aircraft operation.

Airport and anti-hijack security

CAAB makes all necessary arrangements to ensure security to passengers and aerodromes, and to detect, prevent penetration of terrorist activists on board from within national territory.

Facilitation of passengers

CAAB makes all necessary arrangements to establish and maintain all passenger services and facilities at the terminal of Bangladesh airports. Arrangements for facilities, such as flight information, public address, entertainments, comfortable room and environment for passengers and their attendants are all accomplished by CAAB.

Construction and maintenance of airports

 CAAB constructs, maintains and develops airports, aerodromes whenever and wherever are required to expand the aviation infrastructure and air transportation network in the country.
 CAAB also provides operational accommodation to other organisations and agencies like airlines, Customs, Immigration, Meteorology, Health, Police etc. at the airports.

Development planning

 CAAB studies, evaluates and plans for development of the aviation infrastructure within the country considering necessity and budget. It also maintains liaison with regional partners and ICAO in relation to future development programs masterminded by ICAO.
 CAAB takes all necessary steps for training of its operational officers and employees both domestically and abroad. It also has a Civil Aviation Training Centre in Dhaka.

List of chairmen

Airports in Bangladesh

Airlines in Bangladesh

 Biman Bangladesh Airlines (National flag carrier)
 United Airways
 Regent Airways
 Novoair
 US-Bangla Airlines

AMO/MRO in Bangladesh
 Avalon Aviation Ltd. (First EASA Part-145 AMO/MRO in Bangladesh)

Aviation training organisations in Bangladesh
This is a list of Aviation Training Organisations which are approved by the Civil Aviation Authority of Bangladesh.

 Bangabandhu Sheikh Mujibur Rahman Aviation and Aerospace University
 Biman Bangladesh Airlines Training Center
 Military Institute of Science and Technology
 Aeronautical Institute of Bangladesh
 Bangladesh Air Force Academy
 Aeronautical College of Bangladesh. Under German civil aviation.
 United college of aviation science and management. Under German civil aviation.
 Bangladesh Flying Academy  
 Galaxy Flying Academy

References

External links

 CAAB Official Website
 Ministry of Civil Aviation & Tourism, Bangladesh
 International Civil Aviation Organization
 Flight Information Region In Bangladesh

Bangladesh
Civil aviation in Bangladesh
Air navigation service providers
Government agencies established in 1985
1985 establishments in Bangladesh
Transport authorities in Bangladesh